Louise Field and Janine Thompson defeated Elna Reinach and Julie Richardson in the final, 6–1, 6–2 to win the girls' doubles tennis title at the 1985 Wimbledon Championships.

Seeds

  Andrea Holíková /  Radka Zrubáková (quarterfinals)
  Elna Reinach /  Julie Richardson (final)
  Jenny Byrne /  Michelle Turk (semifinals)
  Louise Field /  Janine Thompson (champions)

Draw

Draw

References

External links

Girls' Doubles
Wimbledon Championship by year – Girls' doubles